Tergeste (minor planet designation: 478 Tergeste) is a rare-type stony asteroid from the outer region of the asteroid belt, approximately 78 kilometers in diameter. It was discovered on 21 September 1901, by Italian astronomer Luigi Carnera at Heidelberg Observatory in southern Germany. It was named after the Italian city of Trieste.

Classification and orbit 

Tergeste orbits the Sun in the outer main-belt at a distance of 2.8–3.3 AU once every 5 years and 3 months (1,915 days). Its orbit has an eccentricity of 0.08 and an inclination of 13° with respect to the ecliptic. The body's observation arc begins with its first used observation at Koenigsberg Observatory, 2 days after its official discovery at Heidelberg.

Physical characteristics 

Tergeste is a stony S-type asteroid, which belongs to the small group of 41 bodies classified as rare L-subtype in the SMASS taxonomy.

Diameter and albedo 

According to the surveys carried out by the Infrared Astronomical Satellite IRAS, the Japanese Akari satellite, and NASA's Wide-field Infrared Survey Explorer with its subsequent NEOWISE mission, Tergeste measures between 77.3 and 85.6 kilometers in diameter, and its surface has an albedo between 0.155 and 0.191. The Collaborative Asteroid Lightcurve Link agrees with the revised WISE results and takes an albedo of 0.1914, an absolute magnitude of 7.96 and a diameter of 77.1 kilometers.

Lightcurves 

In July 2005, a rotational lightcurve of Tergeste was obtained by several photometrists including Laurent Bernasconi, Reiner Stoss, Petra Korlević and Raoul Behrend. The light-curve gave a rotation period of  hours with a brightness variation of 0.23 in magnitude, superseding a period of  hours from the 1980s.

In January 2013, another lightcurve was obtained during a photometric survey by predominantly Polish and Japanese observatories. It gave a similar period of  hours with an amplitude of 0.30 magnitude.

Naming 

This minor planet is named for the northeastern Italian city of Trieste (also known by its pre-Roman name "Tergeste"). It is the birthplace of the discoverer, who also worked there as director of the Trieste Observatory for many years.

References

External links 
 Asteroid Lightcurve Database (LCDB), query form (info )
 Dictionary of Minor Planet Names, Google books
 Asteroids and comets rotation curves, CdR – Observatoire de Genève, Raoul Behrend
 Discovery Circumstances: Numbered Minor Planets (1)-(5000) – Minor Planet Center
 
 

Background asteroids
Tergeste
Tergeste
S-type asteroids (Tholen)
L-type asteroids (SMASS)
19010921